{{Infobox military conflict
|conflict=Battle of the Downs
|partof=the Eighty Years' War
|image=The battle of the downs, by willem van de velde.JPG
|image_size=300px
|caption= The Battle of the Downs  by Willem van de Velde, 1659, RijksMuseum.
|date=21 October 1639
|place=Near The Downs, English Channel
|casus=
|territory=
|result=Dutch victory
|combatant1= Spain   Portugal
|combatant2=
|commander1= Antonio de Oquendo  Lope de Hoces   Miguel de Horna
|commander2= Maarten Tromp  Witte de With  Joost Banckert  Johan Evertsen
|strength1=22 galleys, 29 galleons, 13 frigates, 6,500 sailors, 8,000 marines,  30 transports carrying 9,000 soldiers 
 |strength2=95 warships {{Efn|Dutch Order of Battle; incomplete, since contemporaneous Dutch sources only list participating captains and in many cases it is unknown which ship they commanded
26 September:
Aemilia 57 (Tromp, flag captain Barend Barendsz Cramer) Rotterdam
Frederik Hendrik 36 (Pieter Pietersz de Wint) Amsterdam; on 21 October this was Witte de With's flagship
Hollandsche Tuyn 32 (Lambert IJsbrandszoon Halfhoorn) Northern Quarter (Noorderkwartier)
Salamander 40 (Laurens Pietersz Backhuysen) – WIC ship
Gelderland 34 (Willem van Colster) Rotterdam
Sampson 32 (Claes Cornelisz Ham) Noorderkwartier
Omlandia 28 (Jan Gerbrandszoon) Frisia 
Groot Christoffel 28 (hired by Noorderkwartier admiralty, Frederick Pieterszoon) – blew up on 26 September
Deventer 28 (Robert Post) Amsterdam
Gideon 24 (Hendrick Jansz Kamp) Frisia
Meerminne 28 (Jan Pauluszoon) Zealand
Veere 32 (Cornelis Ringelszoon) Zealand

Reinforcements 27 September:
Maeght van Dordrecht 42 (Vice-Admiral Witte de With) Rotterdam
Overijssel 24 (Jacques Forant) Amsterdam
Utrecht 30 (Gerrit Meyndertsz den Uyl) Amsterdam
Sint Laurens 32 (A.Dommertszoon)
Bommel 28 (Sybrant Barentsz Waterdrincker) Amsterdam

Reinforcements 28 September:
Banckert squadron:
t Wapen van Zeeland 28 (Vice-Admiral Joost Banckert) ZealandZeeridder 34 (Frans Jansz van Vlissingen) ZealandZutphen 28 (Joris van Cats) AmsterdamWalcheren 28 (Jan Theunisz Sluis) Amsterdam
'''t Wapen van Holland 39 (Lieven Cornelisz de Zeeuw) Noorderkwartier
Neptunis 33 (Albert 't Jongen Hoen) Noorderkwartier
Amsterdam 10 (Pieter Barentsz Dorrevelt) Amsterdam 
Drenthe 16 (Gerrit Veen) Amsterdam
Rotterdam 10 (Joris Pietersz van den Broecke) Frisia
Arnemuyden 22 (Adriaen Jansz de Gloeyende Oven) Zealand
Ter Goes 24 (Abraham Crijnssen) Zealand
Friesland 22 (Tjaert de Groot) Frisia After reinforcements 30 SeptemberEvertsen squadron:Vlissingen 34 (Vice-Admiral Johan Evertsen, flag captain Frans Jansen) ZeelandDe With squadron: thirty ships, four fireshipsJol squadron, seven ships:Jupiter (Cornelis Cornelisz Jol "Houtebeen") WICDe Nijs squadron, eight ships}}
|casualties1=35 ships  5,000 sailors or marines  3,000 soldiers captured or interned in England
|casualties2=100–1,000 men1–10 ships lost
}}

The Battle of the Downs' took place on 21 October 1639 (New Style), during the Eighty Years' War. A Spanish fleet, commanded by Admiral Antonio de Oquendo, was decisively defeated by a Dutch force under Lieutenant-Admiral Maarten Tromp. Victory ended Spanish efforts to re-assert naval control over the English Channel and confirmed Dutch dominance of the sea lanes, while it is also alleged to be the first major action to feature line of battle tactics.

The battle was initiated when Spanish chief minister Olivares sent a large convoy of troops and supplies for the Army of Flanders, escorted by some 50 warships. Since 1621, Spanish naval activity in the Channel had focused on avoiding direct conflict with the superior Dutch fleet, while attacking their merchant ships from bases in Dunkirk and Ostend. In a change from this policy, Oquendo was ordered to deliver the reinforcements but also bring the Dutch to battle; Olivares hoped victory would restore Spanish prestige and force the States General to negotiate peace terms.

The Spanish entered the Channel on 11 September and were intercepted by the Dutch in a series of actions between 16 and 18 September. Losses on both sides were minimal, but Oquendo took refuge in The Downs, an anchorage between the ports of Dover and Deal, where he was protected by English neutrality. Although blockaded here by the Dutch fleet, most of the reinforcements were transported to Dunkirk via small, fast frigates.

On 21 October, the Dutch entered the Downs and attacked the Spanish fleet with fireships. Unable to manoeuvre in the cramped waters and with the wind against them, the Spanish lost around ten ships captured or destroyed, while another twelve deliberately ran themselves ashore to avoid capture. Combined with the repulse of a similar-sized expedition against Dutch Brazil in January 1640, this marked the end of attempts to challenge Dutch maritime supremacy and an acceptance by the Spanish court that the war could not be won.

Background
When the Franco-Spanish War began in 1635, Spain was already engaged in the Eighty Years War with the Dutch Republic, as well as supporting Emperor Ferdinand II in the Thirty Years War. Although the Spanish Empire had far greater resources than any of its opponents, fighting on multiple fronts forced them to rely on long and vulnerable lines of communication. The most important was the Spanish Road, an overland route funnelling troops and supplies from their possessions in Italy to the Army of Flanders. This was crucial for the war in the Netherlands since Dutch naval superiority made it difficult to send these by sea.

In December 1638, a French-backed army under Bernard of Saxe-Weimar captured Breisach in Alsace, severing the Spanish Road (see map). However, the Spanish defeated Dutch attacks on Dunkirk and Ostend in the Spanish Netherlands, and despite a French naval victory at Getaria in August, forced them to retreat from Fuenterrabía. This encouraged chief minister Olivares to reassert Spanish naval prestige by sending a large convoy to reinforce Flanders. Stripping 22 galleys from the Mediterranean, combined with a hurried construction program, meant that by August 1639 Olivares had assembled a fleet of around 50 warships along with a number of smaller vessels, manned by 6,500 sailors and 8,000 marines. 

In addition, 9,000 reinforcements and three million escudos for the Army of Flanders were carried in 30 transports, which included ships chartered from Germany and England, contracted under an agreement with Charles I. Dating back to the early 1630s and known as the "English Road", this took advantage of English neutrality to ship supplies and men to Dover, where they transferred to small, fast vessels for the trip across the English Channel to Dunkirk. In May, a flotilla of nine ships used this route to transport 1,500 men to Flanders, one of many similar transfers that took place over the years.         

Since 1621, the Spanish had avoided major conflict with the Dutch fleet in favour of raids conducted by the Dunkirk-based Armada de Flandre and privateers on their commercial shipping. In October 1637, Lope de Hoces, commander of the Armada de Coruña, transported 5,000 men from A Coruña to Dunkirk, then captured over 20 Dutch merchant ships on his return voyage. Now confident enough to seek a full-scale battle, Olivares offered him command of the expedition, but de Hoces was sceptical of his own ability to defeat the Dutch, especially given that the galleys which formed a significant part of his force were far less effective in the Channel. He refused the position, which passed instead to Antonio de Oquendo, admiral in the Mediterranean. Olivares expected the Dutch would try to prevent delivery of the reinforcements, giving Oquendo the opportunity to bring them to battle. 

Advised of these movements, the States General began preparing the main Dutch fleet for action. While this was being done, a squadron led by Maarten Tromp was ordered to sea to monitor and harass the Spanish if needed, although he was forbidden from engaging them in battle until joined by the rest of the fleet, some fifty vessels under Johan Evertsen. Tromp divided his force into three; 12 ships under Joost Banckert  were positioned north of the Downs, in the unlikely event the Spanish took the long route around the British Isles. Five ships under Witte de With  patrolled the English side of the Channel, while the remaining 12 under Tromp  monitored the French coast.

Preliminary actions; 16 to 18 September

Attempts by the French admiral Henri de Sourdis to disrupt Spanish preparations failed and the fleet sailed on 27 August, entering the Channel on 11 September. Ships of different squadrons were mixed through the formation, an attempt to ensure smaller ships would be supported by larger ones. The vanguard was composed of thirteen ships from the Armada de Flandre under Miguel de Horna, since they had the most experience in these waters; De Horna himself accompanied Oquendo on board his flagship. 

On 15 September, they learned from a passing English ship that a Dutch squadron was anchored near Calais and the next day made contact with Tromp. Following his instructions, Oquendo adopted a half-moon formation, placing his flagship on the right flank; despite being outnumbered, Tromp placed his squadron into line of battle and attacked. Oquendo used the same tactics employed in his 1631 victory at Abrolhos, where he had destroyed the Dutch flagship in a single ship to ship battle. He failed to issue adequate instructions to his subordinates and negated his superior numbers by constantly seeking to engage Tromp's flagship. This manoeuver, however, was effected without warning the rest of the Spanish fleet. Some of the ships near Oquendo turned with him, others were confused and maintained bearing. The half-moon formation quickly disintegrated, and only the Dunkirk squadron and the galleon San Juan kept up with the Spanish flagship's pursuit of Tromp.

Had Oquendo given the order for a line, the immense Spanish fleet could have probably encircled and dispatched the Dutch squadron in a few hours. However, Oquendo seemed intent on boarding the Dutch flagship. When he finally decided to turn for a shot, he did it too late and sailed past the Tromp's poop. Trying to correct his error, Oquendo attempted to board the second ship in the Dutch column. The latter also avoided him. Oquendo's flagship and one of the Dunkirk ships, the Santiago, were now downwind and on the receiving end of the cannonades of the remaining nine ships of the Dutch column. Tromp turned his column and went for another round on the Santiago. Oquendo, the other six Dunkirk ships and the San Juan, unable to turn upwind, fired as they could. The artillery did little damage, but Spanish musketry picked off many on the Dutch decks.

This encounter lasted for three hours, in the course of which the Dutch ship Groot Christoffel accidentally exploded. By noon, the six ships of the Witte de With column had reached Tromp, and increased his number to 16. Although the rest of the Spanish fleet remained dispersed and disorganized, many units had finally turned and were also approaching from the other side. For Tromp, this was building up into a dangerous situation, as the Spanish units upwind would cut off his exit, and force the Dutch squadron to turn into the shoals of the bay of Boulogne and almost certainly run aground. However, at this moment, Oquendo ordered the Spanish fleet to resume a half-moon formation. The Spanish ships turned, allowing Tromp's squadron to turn also, gain the wind, and escape the danger.

There were no more engagements that evening. The fleets anchored in, and the next day, rear-admiral Joost Banckert arrived, bringing the total Dutch fleet to thirty-two. But there was no engagement, just preparations for what was to become known as the action of 18 September 1639.

The Spanish, whose priority was to protect the troops, not to endanger them by continuing the battle, took refuge in The Downs, an anchorage between the English ports of Dover and Deal, near an English squadron commanded by Vice-Admiral John Pennington. Ocquendo ordered 13 of his Dunkirker squadron, composed of light, fast frigates, to head north at night round the Goodwin Sands; although the Dutch later sealed this exit, they arrived in Dunkirk with 3,000 troops and all the bullion intended to pay the Army of Flanders. Ultimately, the Spanish calculated 6,000 troops had been landed, with 1,500 captured by the Dutch and another 1,500 either killed or interned in England, which allowed Ocquendo to later claim he had largely achieved the objectives set.   

On the evening of 28 September, Tromp and De With withdrew to resupply, for they were short of gunpowder. They feared they had failed in their mission until they rediscovered the Spanish at the Downs on the 30th. Together, they blockaded the Spanish and sent urgently to the Netherlands for reinforcements. The five Dutch admiralties hired any large armed merchant ship they could find. Many joined voluntarily, hoping for a rich bounty. By the end of October, Tromp had 95 ships and 12 fire ships.

Meanwhile, the Spanish, who earlier had managed to sneak 13 or 14 Dunkirker frigates through the blockade, began to transport their troops and money to Flanders on British ships under an English flag. Tromp stopped this by searching the English vessels and detaining any Spanish troops he found. Uneasy about the possible English reaction to this, he pretended to Pennington to be worried by his secret orders from the States-General. He showed him, "confidentially", a missive commanding him to attack the Spanish armada wherever it might be located and to prevent by force of arms any interference by a third power.

The battle

On 21 October, an easterly wind giving him the weather gage, Tromp detached 30 ships under De With to prevent any interference from Pennington, while two squadrons commanded by Cornelis Jol and Jan Hendriksz de Nijs blocked escape routes to the north and south respectively. He then attacked with the remainder, which included a number of fireships. Some of the large, unmanoeuverable Spanish ships panicked on approach of the Dutch fleet and grounded themselves deliberately; they were immediately plundered by the English populace, present in great numbers to watch the uncommon spectacle. Others tried a planned breakthrough.

De Oquendo's Royal Flagship, the Santiago, came out first followed by the Santa Teresa, the Portuguese flagship. Five blazing fireships were sent into the Spanish ships. The first Spanish ship could disengage and avoid three of the fireships at the last moment, but these hit the following Santa Teresa, who had just managed to repel the attack of the other two. Too big (the biggest ship in the Spanish/Portuguese fleet) and slow to manoeuvre, and with no time to react, the Santa Teresa was finally grappled and set on fire by one fire ship. With Admiral Lope de Hoces already dead from his wounds, she fiercely burned with great loss of life.

The Portuguese ships were intercepted by the squadron of the Zeelandic Vice-Admiral Johan Evertsen who launched his fireships against them: most Portuguese ships were taken or destroyed, leaving according to some reports 15,200 dead and 1,800 prisoner. The number of dead is today considered as greatly exaggerated; for example, it does not take into account that a third of the troops had already reached Flanders. De Oquendo managed to escape in the fog with about ten ships, most of them Dunkirkers, and reach Dunkirk. Nine of the ships driven ashore during the battle could be later refloated and also reached Dunkirk.

Losses

According to Spanish naval historian Cesáreo Fernández Duro, of the 38 ships that attempted to break the Dutch blockade, twelve beached themselves on the English shore, nine of which were later refloated and managed to reach Dunkirk. One was destroyed by a fireship and another nine captured, three being so badly damaged they sank before reaching port; another three were wrecked on the coasts of France or Flanders while trying to avoid capture.

The French diplomat Comte d'Estrades, in a letter to Cardinal Richelieu, claimed that the Spanish had lost thirteen ships burnt or sunk, sixteen captured with 4,000 prisoners, and lost fourteen off the coasts of France and Flanders, a figure higher than the number of Spanish ships present at the Downs. D'Estrades also reported in his letter that the Dutch had lost ten ships sunk or burnt. This source is cited by Jean Le Clerc in his Histoire des Provinces-Unies des Pays-Bas. 

The Portuguese Admiral and historian Ignacio Costa Quintella gives figures of 43 ships and 6,000 men lost by the Spanish and some ships and more than 1,000 men by the Dutch.

The Dutch sources only mention the loss of one Dutch ship that got entangled with the Santa Teresa'' and about a hundred persons dead. Historian M.G de Boer's extensively researched book about the subject confirms this and puts Spanish losses in ships and men at about 40 and 7,000 respectively.

Aftermath
The celebrated Dutch victory marked a significant moment in the shifting balance of naval power. However the larger part of the infantry managed to reach Flanders along with all the money. Of the ships that succeeded in breaking through the blockade, many were severely damaged. Spain, straining under the vast commitments of the Thirty Years War, was in no position to rebuild its naval dominance. Fighting over trade continued between Dutch and Dunkirker forces and the convoy itself was just one of a number; but these convoys paid a heavy price in lives and ships in running the Dutch blockades. These complicated operations in the Low Countries had left the overall Spanish Habsburg forces and finances in a precarious situation. The Dutch, English, and French were quick to take advantage by seizing some small Spanish island possessions in the Caribbean. But by far the worst effects for Spain were the increased difficulties it suffered in maintaining its position in the Southern Netherlands.

Tromp was hailed as a hero on his return and was rewarded with 10,000 guldens,  invoking the jealousy of De With who only got 1,000. De With wrote some anonymous pamphlets painting Tromp as avaricious and himself as the real hero of the battle. With Spain gradually losing its dominant naval position, England weak, and France not yet in possession of a strong navy, the Dutch allowed their own navy to diminish greatly after a peace treaty was signed in 1648. So, with an ineffective naval administration and ships that were too light and too few in number, they were to find themselves at a serious disadvantage in their coming struggles with the English. However, they were able to maintain their large mercantile advantage over the English, entering into a period of increasing Dutch maritime superiority, both  mercantile and naval, from the Second Anglo-Dutch War, until the onset of the 18th century.

Notes

References

Sources
 
 
 
 
 
 
 
 
 
 
 
 
 
 
 
 

1639 in Europe
Downs 1639
Battles involving Flanders
Naval battles of the Thirty Years' War
Military history of the English Channel
Conflicts in 1639
17th century in Kent
Naval battles involving the Dutch Republic
Battles involving the Dutch Republic
Eighty Years' War (1621–1648)
Naval battles involving Portugal
Naval battles of the Dutch–Portuguese War